The 1893 Kansas Jayhawks football team represented the University of Kansas in the Western Interstate University Football Association (WIUFA) during the 1893 college football season. In their second and final season under head coach A. W. Shepard. Despite finishing with a 2–5 overall record and being outscored by their opponents by a combined total of 108 to 85, the Jayhawks were WIUFA co-champions due to their 2–1 conference record. The Jayhawks played their home games at McCook Field in Lawrence, Kansas. A. R. Champlin was the team captain.

Schedule

References

Kansas
Kansas Jayhawks football seasons
Kansas Jayhawks football